Into The Ashes is a 2019 American action drama film written, produced and directed by Aaron Harvey, starring Luke Grimes, Frank Grillo, Robert Taylor, James Badge Dale and Marguerite Moreau. It was released theatrically in the United States on July 19, 2019 by RLJE Films.

Plot
The film follows Nick, a blue-collar ex-con who lives in a small town in the Alabama countryside. When Sloan, an insidious figure from his past, shows up and kills his wife, it sends Nick's world into a tailspin. Hell-bent on revenge, he tracks down Sloan and his gang, all the while having to deal with his father-in-law, the local  sheriff Frank, who is forced to wrestle with his own morality in the midst of his daughter's murder. When Nick and Frank's paths finally cross after Nick has exacted his revenge, Frank has to make a final decision: whether to compromise his ethical standpoint and let Nick go, or continue to abide by the rules of the law which govern his conduct.

Cast
 Luke Grimes as Nick Brenner
 Frank Grillo as Sloan
 Marguerite Moreau as Tara Brenner
 Robert Taylor as Frank Parson
 James Badge Dale as Sal Porter
 Andrea Frankle as Marlene Porter
 Brady Smith as Brad Engels
 Dave Maldonado as Jordan
 Jeff Pope as Junior
 David Cade as Charlie
 Scott Peat as Bruce
 Rob Mello as Forchet

Production
It was announced in January 2018 that Luke Grimes, Frank Grillo and Robert Taylor were to star, with Aaron Harvey writing and directing the film. Further casting continued in January 2018 with James Badge Dale, Marguerite Moreau, Scott Peat, David Cade and Brady Smith joining the cast. Filming began that month in Birmingham, Alabama.

Release
The film was released in theaters on July 19, 2019 by RLJE Films.

Reception
Richard Roeper, writing for the Chicago Sun Times, gave the film 3 out of 4 stars writing "while not all the pieces of the puzzle fit perfectly into place, it's still a good yarn filled with arresting visuals and solid performances." Douglas Davidson of Elements of Madness gave the film a positive review, stating "With proper expectations, Aaron Harvey’s Into the Ashes is an engaging, well-performed, introspective crime thriller."

References

External links
 
 
 

2019 films
2019 action drama films
2019 action thriller films
American action drama films
American action thriller films
2010s English-language films
Films directed by Aaron Harvey
2010s American films